Juan Bustos may refer to:

Juan Bustos (politician) (1935–2008), Chilean politician, and lawyer
Juan Bustos (footballer) (born 1992), Costa Rican footballer